Christian Dashiell Ruhemann N'Guessan (born 20 October 1998) is an English professional footballer who plays for National League South club Ebbsfleet United, as a midfielder.
He is the brother of former professional footballer Joseph N'Guessan

Club career
N'Guessan began his career with Blackpool where he went on to win the North-West Youth Alliance title and Lancashire FA Youth Cup in the 2016–17 season. On 6 December 2016, he made the bench for the first team for an EFL Trophy defeat to Doncaster Rovers on penalties. On 9 December 2016, he signed for Northern Premier League Division One North side Bamber Bridge on a work experience loan.

In July 2017, he signed for Burnley on a two-year deal with the option of a further year, and was placed into the Development Squad. On 2 January 2020, he signed for EFL League Two side Oldham Athletic on loan for the remainder of the season.

In May 2021, N'Guessan joined National League South side Ebbsfleet United after impressing on trial.

Career statistics

References

1998 births
Living people
English footballers
Footballers from Lewisham
Blackpool F.C. players
Bamber Bridge F.C. players
Burnley F.C. players
Oldham Athletic A.F.C. players
Ebbsfleet United F.C. players
English Football League players
Northern Premier League players
Association football midfielders
Black British sportspeople